The Athletics at the 2016 Summer Paralympics – Women's 100 metres T44 event at the 2016 Paralympic Games took place on 17 September 2016, at the Estádio Olímpico João Havelange.

Heats

Heat 1 
12:24 17 September 2016:

Heat 2 
12:30 17 September 2016:

Heat 3 
12:36 17 September 2016:

Final 
20:34 17 September 2016:

Notes

Athletics at the 2016 Summer Paralympics